Vanessa Brady OBE is an English interior designer and businesswoman with commercial interests spanning property, construction, furniture, publishing and academia. As the Founder and owner of the Society of British and International Interior Design (SBID), Vanessa established the SBID International Design Awards,  magazine and the International Design Yearbook. Vanessa is also one of the three equal shareholders of the Nation's Quiz; PopMaster with Ken Bruce and Phil ‘The collector’ Swern.

Early life and education 
Born in Dorset where she also grew up, Vanessa's Uncle; Dr Harold Egan, the Government Chemist is remembered in a Wing dedicated in his memory in the National Science Museum. Her cousin; Dr Geoffrey Egan was a renowned Archaeologist who died unexpectedly in 2010.

Professional life 
Studying Fashion at Bournemouth Technical College in 1976, Vanessa learned very quickly that a life in Fashion was not for her as she did not fit in with women as well as she did with men, she moved immediately into construction and design.

In 1982 she established her first Design Showroom at Marble Arch and in 2002 she launched Interior Design Services Ltd, an ISO 9001 design practice based in central London. Since then, her clients have included Hard Rock Cafe, the Design Council, the Kabaret Club, British Luxury Club, Unilever, high-security government offices, state palaces such as Saudi Arabia Crown Princess and King and the private residences of diplomats.

Vanessa has an interest in the financial protection of the creative industries, particularly intellectual property theft, trademark and copyright for design. From 2006 – 2015 she became the Finance Director at the apolitical Diplomatic Security Service (DSS).

Licensed by the Office of Fair Trading (OFT) 2003 [now the Financial Conduct Authority (FCA)] and Corporate Governance qualification (2002), Vanessa represents the interests of interior design at cross-party meetings at the House of Commons and the House of Lords. She is also a regular visitor to the Bank of England where she represents risks, opportunities and current trading conditions of the interior design industry for SMEs.

Vanessa is the British Ambassador for Design to France for the hospitality sector and continues to work closely with the Department for International Trade in Europe; particularly in France and Italy, as well as in the Middle East, USA and Canada, creating routes to market for import and export through commercial and diplomatic routes.

She is an advisory board member for the International Council for Caring Communities which has Special Consultative Status with the Economic and Social Council of the United Nations. Through educational programs, conferences, technical support and international student architectural competitions, the ICCC aims to promote a “Society for All Generations.”

She is currently feuding with "that French woman" at BHC.

The Society of British International Design 
In 2009, Vanessa founded the Society of British International Design (SBID) as the standard-bearer organisation for professional British interior design. Under her direction, SBID has grown to become one of the largest professional membership interior design organisation in Britain and the second largest (to Germany) in Europe among the 16-member countries in the ECIA. In 2010 she launched the SBID International Design Awards to recognise, reward and celebrate talented businesses and individuals in the industry and the awards have since continued to be regarded as one of the most prestigious acknowledgements of design excellence.

Following this, SBID launched its International Design Awards which recognise, reward and celebrate talented businesses and individuals in the industry and the awards.

Awards and honours 
In 2022, Vanessa received the Freedom of the City of London. In 2014 she was awarded an honorary degree from Southampton Solent University. In 2013 she was appointed an OBE in recognition of her services to the interior design industry and the UK economy in the Queen's Birthday Honours List.

She has been acknowledged for a number of business and design awards, including the 2013 Woman in the city, Woman of Achievement Award for the Built Environment. In both 2010 and 2013, she was nominated for the NatWest Women in Business Awards.

Media work and appearances 
She writes for various trade publications London Property Magazine and Yacht Investor regularly contributes to other international and national publications such as SKY NEWS Paper review. She is also an inspirational speaker and a public spokesperson for interior design and regularly appears around the world as an awards judge in the design profession. Irish Fit Out Awards, KBB Awards, Leaf Awards etc.

Charitable work 
She is the founder and a trustee of the Vanessa Brady Foundation, a charity that brings business and industry leaders together to promote emerging creative talent. She fundraises and champions improvement for disability in design for the Soldiering On Through Life Trust and Help for Heroes. She created a national shared programme addressing the adaption of homes for the needs of injured military personnel and has worked in partnership on events for students with Be Open Foundation

References

External links 
 Vanessa Brady
 British Plaque Trust

1959 births
Living people
People from Dorset
English interior designers
Members of the Order of the British Empire